Camden is a resort town in Knox County, Maine. The population was 5,232 at the 2020 census. The population of the town more than triples during the summer months, due to tourists and summer residents. Camden is a summer colony in the Mid-Coast region of Maine.  Similar to Bar Harbor, Nantucket and North Haven, Camden is well known for its summer community of wealthy  Northeasterners, mostly from Boston, New York City, and Philadelphia.

History

The Penobscot Nation have lived in the area for thousands of years. They called it Megunticook, meaning "great swells of the sea", a reference to the silhouette of the Camden Hills (more visibly seen on a bright night). Although part of the Waldo Patent, Europeans did not attempt to colonize it until after the French and Indian War, around 1771–1772. They were led by James Richards, who built a home at the mouth of the Megunticook River. Others soon followed, squatting on Penobscot land and attempting to farm the broken and often mountainous terrain. The first home in the area was the Conway House, a Cape Cod style home built in 1770. In 1962, it was purchased and renovated into a history museum.

When Castine was held by the British in 1779, Camden became a rendezvous point and encampment for the Americans, who were commanded by Major George Ulmer. During a raid, the British burned a sawmill. On February 17, 1791, the Massachusetts General Court incorporated Megunticook Plantation as Camden, named after Charles Pratt, 1st Earl Camden, a member of the British Parliament and proponent of civil liberties. During the War of 1812, a battery was built atop Mount Battie near the village. It had both a 12- and 18-pounder gun, but no gunner qualified to operate them. Nevertheless, the fort's appearance of readiness kept the British at bay.

When peace returned, Camden grew rapidly. The Megunticook River provided excellent water power sites for mills. In addition to sawmills and gristmills, by 1858 the town had carriage factories, sash and blind factories and blacksmith shops. There were six shipyards, launching ten to twelve vessels annually. By 1886, the town also made foundry products, railroad cars, woolens and paper mill feltings, anchors, wedges, plugs and treenails, planking, powder kegs, excelsior, mattresses, powder, tinware, oakum, wool rolls, boots and shoes, leather, flour and meal, corn brooms and barrels. Camden was second only to nearby Rockland in the lucrative manufacture of lime, excavated at quarries and processed in kilns before being shipped to various ports around the United States until 1891, when Rockport was set off as a separate town. As the 19th century came to an end, Camden was very much a shipbuilding town with the H.M. Bean Yard launching the largest four-masted schooner Charlotte A. Maxwell and the first six-master ever built-the George W. Wells.

In the 1880s, sportsmen and "rusticators," began to discover the natural beauty of Camden during the summer and autumn, becoming seasonal residents. Sarah Orne Jewett's stories of nostalgia for the sea, Camden's scenery, fine old homes of sea captains, and the paintings of Fitz Hugh Lane, Frederick Church, and Childe Hassam evoked a romantic vision of Maine and induced many to come to stay at the Bayview House Hotel, Ocean House, and Mrs. Hosmer's Boarding House. In 1880, Edwin Dillingham built the first purpose-built summer cottages in Camden on Dillingham Point. Thereafter, the summer colony at Camden quickly grew to include some of the wealthiest, most prominent families in the country.  These new summer residents from Philadelphia, Boston, New York, Washington, D.C. and even Chicago, built large, rambling Shingle Style "cottages" along High Street, Bay View Street and on Beauchamp Point to rival those in Bar Harbor. The summer people arrived on the Boston Boats or on the Maine Central Railroad at Rockland. Local residents, who had formerly gone to sea to earn a living, found jobs as caretakers, gardeners, and carpenters to the rich and powerful.

In November 1892, a fire fed by a strong easterly wind-burned the business district to the ground. Immediately, Camden businessmen drew together to make the investment required to build 12 large brick buildings, including the Camden Opera House and, controversially, the Masonic Temple (now the Lord Camden Inn).  The Great Fire, as it became known, did not, however, discourage increasing numbers of affluent summer people from making Camden their summer enclave. Indeed, in 1897 a road was built to the top of Mt. Battie, one of the two mountains rising above the town, and an inn was erected at the summit. In 1898, a group of wealthy summer residents from Philadelphia established the Megunticook Golf Club on Beauchamp Point. And in 1901, the Whitehall Inn opened on High Street in an old mansion built by a sea captain, catering to a well-to-do clientele.  Around the turn of the century families such as Curtis, Bok, Keep, Gribbel, Dillingham and Borland not only built estates but their donations resulted in the public library, the amphitheatre, which was designed by Fletcher Steele, the Camden Harbor Park, which was designed by the Olmsted Brothers, the Village Green, and the Camden Opera House.

Camden Yacht Club
The Philadelphia publishing tycoon, Cyrus Curtis, maintained a summer home and several yachts in Camden. Given the many other private yachts of the upper class that filled Camden Harbor as well, Curtis decided in 1912 to establish and build the Camden Yacht Club. In 2006, as part of the club's centennial celebrations, the Club published 'From steam to sail : 100 years of the Camden Yacht Club"  Yachting continues to thrive in Camden, particularly during the summer months, with the HAJ Boat racing fleet at the Yacht Club with the younger sailors in their turnabouts. In 1936 the cruise schooner business was started by Captain Frank Swift and the windjammer fleet continues to this day.

Music and culture
Music and cultural interests have long flourished in Camden.  In 1912, Edna St. Vincent Millay read "Renascence," a poem she wrote from the top of Mt. Battie, to the guests at the Whitehall Inn, one of whom offered to pay her tuition to Vassar. After graduating from Vassar, she went on to write poetry and plays that made her one of the most famous women in America and an inspiration for the Roaring Twenties, winning the Pulitzer Prize. The French harpist, composer and conductor, Carlos Salzedo, founded the internationally renowned Salzedo Summer Harp Colony in Camden and each summer held a Harp Festival in the amphitheater beside the library. Camden/Rockport also is home to the Bay Chamber Concert Company. Theatre productions at the Opera House and Shakespeare in the Amphitheatre enriched the lives of residents and summer visitors for generations. In the 1950s, artists and writers of significant reputation began moving to Camden and neighboring Rockport, where local artists organized Maine Coast Artists. Wayne Doolittle began publishing Down East Magazine in 1954, and in 1956 Carousel was filmed in Camden, followed by Peyton Place in 1957, because the quaint, old town with its picturesque harbor and scenery, looked like the picture-perfect American town. Since then Camden's setting has not gone unnoticed by Hollywood with Steven King's Thinner and Casper in 1995, Todd Field's In the Bedroom in 2001, and with the soap opera Passions using Camden for shots depicting the fictional town Harmony.

Camden's many prominent summer and year-round residents have been a valuable resource to the town in many ways over the past 125 years, a tradition of partnership which continues today in many forms, not least by helping to establish some internationally renowned events, namely The Camden Conference and Pop!Tech.  The Camden Conference has been held annually for nearly a quarter of a century to foster informed discourse on world issues.  Convened in the historic Camden Opera House, the event draws some of the best minds on foreign policy to share their insights and expertise on a range of global issues. The Pop!Tech conference, which takes place each fall, gathers a global community of cutting-edge leaders, thinkers, and doers from many different disciplines to explore the social impact of new technologies, the forces of change shaping our future, and new approaches to solving the world's most significant challenges.

The town is home to a summer Shakespeare festival, the Camden Shakespeare Company, which performs in an amphitheater behind the town library. During the second weekend of February, the annual U.S. National Toboggan Championships are held at the town-owned Camden Snow Bowl. This nationally known race started as a lark for something to do during the long Maine winters, and more than 20 years later is one of New England's premier cold-weather events. Most racers arrive in costume, and 100% percent of race revenue is used to offset operating expenses for this recreation area.

Camden is the location of the 2000 HGTV Dream Home.

The Points North Institute, located in Camden and Rockport, Maine, is organizing the annual Camden International Film Festival (CIFF) founded in 2005. It focuses exclusively on documentary film and building community among the professional filmmakers. The Points North Forum was launched in 2009 to provide debates about documentary developments on a par with peers. Over the following years more than 50 funders, broadcasters, distributors and producers have been participating annually. Further on, in 2015 as a partnership with Tribeca Film Institute the Camden/TFI Retreat was started, a week-long educational program. Additionally was introduced: the Shortform Editing Residency, the North Star Fellowship, Points North 1:1 Meetings, and the 4th World Indigenous Media Lab.

In popular culture
The 2001 Best Picture Academy Award nominated film In the Bedroom had scenes that were shot in Camden. Specifically, the historic welcome arch, the bar where Tom Wilkinson's character goes looking for his son's friend, the Camden Harbor Park and Amphitheatre where Sissy Spacek's character directs the Balkan Girl's Chorus in an outdoor concert, the exterior of the bar where her son's killer is working, and the shots of the town at dawn from the summit of Mount Battie for the film's finale
 The majority of the 1995 film Casper was filmed in Camden, though the story takes place in Friendship. The production crew chose Camden, citing it to be "more authentic". In the film, Friendship is home to a fictional Art Nouveau mansion called Whipstaff Manor, which is haunted by four ghosts. However Whipstaff Manor is not a real mansion located on the sea front of Camden. The lower exterior and interior of the mansion was built on a set.
 Other movies shot in Camden includes Captains Courageous (1937), Carousel (1957) and Peyton Place (1957) and Head Above Water (1996).

Geography
Drained by the Megunticook River, Camden is located beside Penobscot Bay and the Gulf of Maine, part of the Atlantic Ocean. Principal bodies of water include: Megunticook Lake, Hosmer Pond (54 acres), Impoundment (Seabright Pond) (74 acres) and Lily Pond (32 acres). Mount Megunticook has an elevation of 1385 feet (419 m).

The town is crossed by U. S. Route 1 and state routes 52 and 105. It borders the towns of Rockport to the south, Hope to the southwest, and Lincolnville to the north.

Climate

Like most of New England, Camden has a humid continental climate with wide variations in temperature between seasons.

Demographics

2010 census
As of the census of 2010, there were 4,850 people, 2,382 households, and 1,313 families residing in the town. The racial makeup of the town was 97.6% White, 0.3% African American, 0.1% Native American, 0.7% Asian, 0.2% from other races, and 1.0% from two or more races. Hispanic or Latino of any race were 1.1% of the population.

There were 2,382 households, of which 21.4% had children under the age of 18 living with them, 43.7% were married couples living together, 8.3% had a female householder with no husband present, 3.1% had a male householder with no wife present, and 44.9% were non-families. 39.2% of all households were made up of individuals, and 22.4% had someone living alone who was 65 years of age or older. The average household size was 2.01 and the average family size was 2.65.

The median age in the town was 53.2 years. 17.9% of residents were under the age of 18; 4.7% were between the ages of 18 and 24; 16.2% were from 25 to 44; 33.5% were from 45 to 64; and 27.7% were 65 years of age or older. The gender makeup of the town was 45.6% male and 54.4% female.

2000 census
At the 2000 census, there were 5,254 people, 2,390 households and 1,414 families residing in the town. The racial makeup of the town was 98.33% White, 0.25% Black, 0.13% Native American, 0.40% Asian, 0.15% from other races, and 0.74% from two or more races. Hispanic or Latino of any race were 0.86% of the population.

There were 2,390 households, of which 24.1% had children under the age of 18 living with them, 49.1% were married couples living together, 8.5% had a divorced female householder, and 40.8% were non-families. 34.8% of all households were made up of individuals, and 16.5% had someone living alone who was 65 years of age or older. The average household size was 2.11 and the average family size was 2.71.

The age distribution was 19.7% under the age of 18, 4.4% from 18 to 24, 22.2% from 25 to 44, 30.3% from 45 to 64, and 23.4% who were 65 years of age or older. The median age was 47 years. For every 100 females, there were 83.6 males. For every 100 females age 18 and over, there were 77.1 males.

The median household income was $39,877, and the median family income was $56,439. Males had a median income of $33,500 versus $26,645 for females. The per capita income for the town was $26,126. About 5.5% of families and 8.0% of the population were below the poverty line, including 6.5% of those under age 18 and 7.2% of those age 65 or over.

Ancestry/ethnicity
As of 2017 the largest self-identified ancestry groups/ethnic groups in Camden, Maine  were:

Economy

Banks
Camden National Bank

Education
Camden is serviced by several public and private schools. They are:
 The Children's House Montessori School
 Ashwood Waldorf School
 People Place Cooperative Preschool
 Service by MSAD 28, which operates:
 Camden Rockport Elementary School
 Camden Rockport Middle School
 Service by the Five Town Community School District, which operates:
Camden Hills Regional High School
 The Watershed School

Sites of interest 

  Bald Mountain
 Bay Chamber Concerts
 Camden Public Library
 The Walsh History Center
 Peyton Place Archives
 Edna St.Vincent Millay Archives
 Camden Hills State Park
 Camden Opera House
 Conway House Museum
 Mary Meeker Cramer Museum
 Camden Snow Bowl
 Curtis Island Lighthouse
 Camden Town office
 Maiden's Cliff

Notable people

Free Land

Camden made national headlines in 2010 after it was announced that the town would be giving some land away (2.8 acres and a run-down leather tannery) for "free", on the condition that a prospectful business owner would have to pay $175,000 to the city of Camden and create 24 "full time" jobs. As of 2012, Camden had yet to find any takers. In fact, the land was still available for "free" as of 2018.

See also
Center for Creative Imaging

References

External links 

 City of Camden
 Chamber of Commerce
 
 Camden Public Library
 The Camden Conference
 Pop!Tech Conference
 Seven Towns Where Land Is Free; CNBC.com; November 17, 2010

 
Towns in Knox County, Maine
Populated places established in the 1770s
Towns in Maine
Populated coastal places in Maine
Resort towns
Marinas in the United States